Superlópez is a 2018 Spanish superhero comedy film directed by Javier Ruiz Caldera based on the comic strip of the same name.

Plot
In the planet Chitón the scientist Jan has created the "ultimative weapon" to fight against the evil dictator Skorba: a baby with superpowers. He sends him in a spaceship to Earth, but Ágata, Skorba's daughter, follows him in another spaceship to capture him. However, the baby's spaceship impacts with the Hispasat satellite, so he lands on Spain, whereas Ágata lands in United States. The baby is adopted by the López family, who teach him to hide his powers, to not make other people jealous of him.

Years later, López is his 30s and has a normal life only using his powers when nobody is watching. In his office his boss and friend Jaime hires Luisa. Jaime is romantically interested in Luisa, but she is more interested in López and they both go on a date. After the date, a subway loses control and López manages to stop it. Footage of this rescue is seen by Ágata, who is now the owner of the biggest tech company in the world.

Ágata creates an ultrasound machine with a message that can only be heard by López, asking him to meet her. He complies and is informed of his true origin. He goes to his parents’ house to confront them and they show him the spaceship. López accidentally activates a holographic message of his biological father, explaining his original planet conflict. His (Earth) parents convince him to try to learn how to use his powers and, after many trials and errors he finally discovers how to fly.

Ágata kidnaps Jaime and Luisa. López manages to rescue them and they go to the house of the parents of López. There Ágata attacks them with a giant mecha robot. López's father distracts Ágata by firing a shotgun at her before being sucked into the mech's vacuum, while López attempts to put on his suit despite the hot weather. With the help of his parents and friends, he finally embraces his abilities to become Superlópez and takes on the robot. Ágata sucks him in, only to push him out and cause him to land within Camp Nou during a match between F.C. Barcelona and Villareal CF. Juan rips out the goal net but misaims and tosses it at his Earth mother. Ágata captures her, before stamping López into the ground. Before she tries to kill him via buzzsaw, Jamie distracts her, while Luisa drives the López's truck. Regaining consciousness over Luisa's cries, López uses his ice breath on the windshield and pushes it into the pool as the mech trips over the Lópezes's truck. López's adoptive parents and Jamie come out of the pool safe, followed by Ágata. López's adoptive mother reminds him that his home planet is still waiting for his help, before he tells her to not worry as he has a plan.

Days later, Skorba's spaceship returns to Chitón with Ágata, carrying the man from the park who everyone believed as "Juan", and appoints him as the planet's new leader. Back on Earth, Juan now becomes a proper superhero, much to the disdain of the press and general public. Luisa and López start dating, while the latter points towards the man who called him Superlópez before he teleports away, leaving behind a pacifier.

Cast 
Dani Rovira as "Superlópez"
Alexandra Jiménez as Luisa Lanas
Julián López as Jaime González 
Pedro Casablanc as adoptive López father
Gracia Olayo as adoptive López mother
Maribel Verdú as Ágata Müller
Ferrán Rañé as Skorba
Gonzalo de Castro as Jan, López biological father

Reception

Box office
The film had the best opening weekend of 2018 after it was released on 23 November 2018, grossing 2.3 million euros from an attendance of 377,501. After only two weeks of its release, the film had grossed more than 7 million euros by 10 December 2018, making it the third highest-grossing Spanish film of 2018. By the end of the year, with a box-office taking of €10.3 million, it had become the second highest grossing Spanish film of 2018 in Spain, after Champions.

Critical reception

The movie received generally positive reviews. Oti Rodríguez in ABC describes it as "a surrealist cross between the sainete, the grotesque and the joke about a serious matter (Superman) that has completely lost any hint of sensibility".  Beatriz Martínez in El Periódico says that is an "intelligent comedy of adventures that through an addictive rhythm reflects on the Spanish idiosyncrasy, mediocrity and mediocrity as engines that drive our society". More negative is Javier Ocaña in El País who says "Nothing is wrong: neither the interpreters nor the situations nor the dialogues nor the direction. And, nevertheless, not a grimace, because nothing is good enough to provoke a certain merrymaking".

See also 
 List of Spanish films of 2018

References

Spanish comedy films
2010s superhero comedy films
Films based on Spanish comics
Buena Vista International films
2018 films
Films produced by Álvaro Augustin
Films produced by Ghislain Barrois
Zeta Studios films
2010s Spanish-language films
Telecinco Cinema films
2010s Spanish films
Spanish superhero films